The Fall River is a Lake Oroville source tributary that drains the south portion of the Middle Fork Feather Watershed.  The river enters the lake along the shore of the North Arm  from the mouth of the North Fork Feather River at the tip of the arm and elevation .  The river is notable as the source of water for Feather Falls in the Lake Oroville State Recreation Area.

References

Feather Headwaters
Rivers of Plumas County, California
Tributaries of the Feather River
Rivers of Northern California